A pilot report or PIREP is a report of actual flight or ground conditions encountered by an aircraft. Reports commonly include information about atmospheric conditions (like temperature, icing, turbulence) or airport conditions (like runway condition codes or ground equipment failures). This information is usually relayed by radio to the nearest ground station, but other options (e.g. electronic submission) also exist in some regions. The message would then be encoded and relayed to other weather offices and air traffic service units.

Although the actual form used to record the PIREP may differ from one country to another, the standards and criteria will remain almost the same. At a minimum the PIREP must contain a header, aircraft location, time, flight level, aircraft type and one other field.

In recent years, a PIREP will also include UA or UUA used to identify the PIREP as routine or urgent.

Included data

Mandatory

UA or UUA used to identify the PIREP as routine or urgent (In Canada this is indicated by the prefix to the PIREP: "UACN01" for an urgent PIREP or "UACN10" for a normal PIREP)
/OV location of the PIREP, in relation to a NAVAID, an aerodrome or geographical coordinates
/TM time the PIREP was received from the pilot (UTC)
/FL flight level or altitude above sea level at the time the PIREP is filed; it is essential for turbulence and icing reports
/TP aircraft type; it is essential for turbulence and icing reports

Optional (at least one is required)

/SK sky cover
/TA ambient temperature; important for icing reports
/WV wind vector referenced in terms of true north (ICAO), or magnetic north (in the United States)
/TB turbulence; intensity, whether it occurred in or near clouds, and duration
/IC icing
/RM remarks
/WX flight visibility and weather

AIREP
Like PIREPs, Aircraft Reports (AIREP) are reports of actual weather conditions of an aircraft in flight. AIREPs are often automated reports, contrary to PIREPs. Likewise, a different encoding is used for either type.

Body
The message identifier "UA" is used when the PIREP contains non-hazardous weather information. If the PIREP contains a report of a tornado, funnel cloud, waterspout, severe turbulence, severe icing, hail, or a low-level wind shear hazard, the identifier "UUA" would be used.

The location (/OV) can be reported in one of three ways: as a direction and distance from a navigation aid (NAVAID), as a direction and distance from an airport, or as the latitude and longitude of the aircraft.

The time (/TM) used is the UTC time that the PIREP is reported.

The flight level (/FL) is reported as either a three digit value that indicates the altitude of the aircraft above sea level in hundreds of feet or can be one of three abbreviations: DURD (during descent or on approach), DURC (during climb or after takeoff) and UNKN (unknown).

Aircraft type (/TP) will be the approved ICAO designator, or UNKN if not reported.

Sky cover (/SK) is used to report the cloud layer amounts and the height of the cloud base. The tops of the cloud layers can also be included, as can more than one layer of cloud. Heights are in hundreds of feet above sea level and are three digits. Abbreviations used in this group are "CLR" (clear), "FEW" (few), "SCT" (scattered), "BKN" (broken) and "OVC" (overcast).

Temperature (/TA) is the air temperature in whole degrees Celsius as a two-digit value, with negative temperatures preceded by a minus (-) sign. In the United States, negative temperatures are preceded by the letter M (M).

Wind velocity (/WV) must contain both the wind speed and direction. Direction is reported as a three-digit value in whole degrees true and the wind speed in knots also in three digits.

Turbulence (/TB) and the intensity are reported in a PIREP based on the aircraft and occupants reaction to the turbulence. The altitude of the turbulence should be included using three-digit groups. When the top or the base of the turbulence is unknown then the abbreviation BLO (below) or ABV (above) should be used. Turbulence should be reported as LGT (light), MDT (moderate), SVR (severe) or in exceptional cases EXTRM (extreme). Clear-air turbulence is reported as CAT.

Icing (/IC) is reported by type and the intensity or rate of accretion. The type of ice is reported as "CLR" (clear), "RIME", or "MXD" (mixed). The intensity is reported as "TR" (trace), "LGT" (light), "MDT" (moderate), and "SVR" (severe). (Units are measured in MSL - MEAN SEA LEVEL)

Remarks (/RM) report on other weather conditions that are not covered in the rest of the PIREP may include such things as icing in precipitation, thunderstorms, St. Elmo's fire and frontal conditions. There are many other types of weather conditions that could be reported in a PIREP.

The above explanation of PIREP fields is Canadian. The United States version may also include a weather (/WX) group, while other countries may use other groups and measurements.

Examples of PIREPs
These examples are taken from the Canadian MANOBS (Manual of Surface Weather Observations) published by Environment Canada.

PIREP:
UACN10 CYQT 192128
YZ WG
UA /OV YSP 090025 /TM 2120 /FL050 /TP BE99 /SK 020BKN040 110OVC /TA -14 /WV 030045 /TB MDT CAT 060-080 /IC LGT RIME 020-040 /RM LGT FZRA INC

Decoded as:
Routine upper air report from Thunder Bay issued at 2128 UTC on the 19th of the month
YZ is Toronto and WG is Winnipeg: these are the Flight Information Regions where the PIREP was issued
Note this would indicate that the icing is picked up in the cloud. The remarks section says that light freezing rain was encountered in the cloud.

PIREP
UACN10 CYXU 032133
YZ
UA /OV YUX 09010 /TM 2120 /FL030 /TP C172 /TB MDT /RM MDT TURB BLO 050 CYKF CYXU

Decoded as:
Routine message from London, issued at 2133 UTC on the 3rd of the month
The Flight Information Region is Toronto
The pilot reported moderate turbulence. The remarks says that the turbulence was below  between Kitchener/Waterloo and London.

Soliciting PIREPs
In the US, air traffic controllers are required to solicit PIREPs upon request of other facilities or pilots, or when any of the following conditions exists or is forecast in their area:

Ceilings at or below 
Visibility at or less than 
Thunderstorms and related phenomena
Turbulence of moderate degree or greater
Icing of light degree or greater
Wind shear 
Volcanic ash clouds

At least once hourly, terminal controllers must obtain a descent/climb-out PIREP, including cloud information and other related phenomena.

See also 
 AMDAR – aircraft meteorological data relay, a WMO FM-42 code for an automatic meteorological report from an aircraft
 ACARS – ARINC Communications Addressing and Reporting System
 SIGMET
 AIRMET

References
 Aeronautical Information Manual, dated April 3, 2014, p. 472

External links 
FAA Pilot Weather Report

Aviation meteorology
Earth sciences data formats
Aviation publications